Panna is a river of Poland, a left tributary of the Mała Noteć in Kwieciszewo.

Rivers of Poland
Rivers of Kuyavian-Pomeranian Voivodeship